Ukraine competed at the 2019 Military World Games held in Wuhan, China from 18 to 27 October 2019. According to the official results athletes representing Ukraine won five gold medals, 13 silver medals and 15 bronze medals; instead, the medal count appears to be 32 rather than 33 (see below). The country finished in 10th place in the medal table.

Medal summary

Medal by sports

Medalists

References 
 2019 Military World Games Results
 2019 Military World Games - Athletics results

Nations at the 2019 Military World Games
2019 in Ukrainian sport